Syriac Church may refer to:

- any Christian denomination within the scope of Syriac Christianity, including:
 Syriac Churches that employ East Syriac Rite
 Syriac Church of the East, an ancient Christian denomination
 Syro-Chaldean Catholic Church, an Eastern Catholic denomination
 Syro-Malabar Catholic Church, an Eastern Catholic denomination
 Syriac Churches that employ West Syriac Rite
 Syriac Orthodox Church, an Oriental Orthodox denomination
 Syro-Malankara Orthodox Church, an Oriental Orthodox denomination
 Syriac Catholic Church, an Eastern Catholic denomination
 Syro-Maronite Catholic Church, an Eastern Catholic denomination
 Syro-Malankara Catholic Church, an Eastern Catholic denomination

See also
 Syriac Churches in India
 East Syriac Church (disambiguation)
 West Syriac Church (disambiguation)
 Syriac (disambiguation)
 Syrian (disambiguation)